De Leunen is a football stadium in Geel, in the Belgian province of Antwerp. It has a capacity of 8,000  after the most recent renovation works. It used to be the home ground of K.F.C. Verbroedering Geel until the club went into liquidation in 2008. Subsequently, the neighbouring club of FC Verbroedering Meerhout left their Kattenstadion in Meerhout to play at De Leunen. The club then changed its name to Verbroedering Geel-Meerhout. In 2012 the club changed its same again to ASV Geel.

References

Football venues in Flanders
Sports venues in Antwerp Province
Sport in Geel